The Outeniqua Choo Tjoe was the last remaining continually-operated passenger steam train in Africa, ending operation in August, 2006. The line on which it operated links the towns of George and Knysna in the Western Cape, South Africa, and was completed in 1928. The scenic  route from George took 3 hours, following the rugged coastline of the Garden Route,and passing through Victoria Bay, Wilderness, Goukamma, and Sedgefield before crossing a bridge over the Knysna Lagoon and ending at the Knysna station. 

The line and steam service were declared an officially preserved railway in 1992. At first carrying about 40,000 passengers per year, the train was carrying 115,000 passengers per year by the early 2000s. 70% of passengers were foreign tourists.

The trains were usually pulled by SAR Class 19D steam locomotives, of 4-8-2 wheel arrangement with Vanderbilt-like "torpedo" tenders, although SAR Class 24 steam engines were also used occasionally.  When dry conditions in the summer increased the risk of wildfires, diesel locomotives (SAR Class 32s) were used instead.

During August 2006 the line was damaged by heavy flooding, and train services were suspended. In November 2006 the Outeniqua Choo Tjoe was temporarily rerouted to run between George and Mossel Bay (with a stop at Hartenbos). This service was discontinued on 17 September, 2010.

In 2007, the train's owners, Transnet Limited, announced that the train was not regarded as part of its core business, and initiated a tender process to dispose of the train to a new owner/operator. In August 2010, Transnet announced that they had not found an operator, and the train would cease operating. The Western Cape Provincial MEC for Finance, Economic Development and Tourism, Alan Winde, said that he was resolved to keep this heritage tourism asset operational.

In May 2018 it was revealed in the British Magazine "Heritage Railway" that while there was ongoing discussion between Transnet and a private enterprise called "Classic Rail," there remained no agreement to franchise the line and re-open it for tourist traffic.

In December, 2021, Transnet Freight Rail put out a Request for Proposals for the management and operation of the line. This tender closed in April, 2022. In September, 2022, Classic Rail announced that it was one of only two bidders in contention for the appointment.

Popular culture 
In 2008, the train and the Kaaiman's River Bridge were featured in a television advertisement for Stella Artois.

References

External links

 Official Site of the Outeniqua Choo Tjoe 
 Friends of the Choo-Tjoe

Transport in the Western Cape
Heritage railways in South Africa
Named passenger trains of South Africa
Tourist attractions in the Western Cape
Railway services discontinued in 2009